Maryorie Nicole Pérez Rodríguez (born 25 November 1997) is a Panamanian footballer who plays as a defender for the Panama women's national team.

International career
Pérez appeared in one match for Panama at the 2018 CONCACAF Women's Championship.

See also
 List of Panama women's international footballers

References

1997 births
Living people
Panamanian women's footballers
Panama women's international footballers
Women's association football defenders